Africa U.S.A. may refer to:

Amusement parks
 Africa U.S.A., an amusement park in Boca Raton, Florida, 1953–1961
 Marine World/Africa USA, an animal theme park in Redwood Shores, California, now Six Flags Discovery Kingdom

Places
 Africa, Indiana, U.S.
 Africa, Ohio, U.S.